South Colton, also referred to as Three Falls, is a hamlet located in the Town of Colton in St. Lawrence County, New York, on NY 56 by the crossing of the Raquette River. Located in South Colton is Sunday Rock, a historic glacial erratic. South Colton has a post office with ZIP code 13687, which opened on November 15, 1854.

References

Hamlets in New York (state)
Hamlets in St. Lawrence County, New York